The 1942 Missouri Tigers football team was an American football team that represented the University of Missouri in the Big Six Conference (Big 6) during the 1942 college football season. The team compiled an 8–3–1 record (4–0–1 against Big 6 opponents), won the Big 6 championship, and outscored all opponents by a combined total of 288 to 107. The team played its home games at Memorial Stadium in Columbia, Missouri.

The team's leading scorer was Bob Steuber with 121 points, a scoring title that remained a Missouri record for 65 years until Jeff Wolfert scored 130 points in 2007.

During the 1942 season, Don Faurot was the head coach for the eighth of 19 seasons. In June 1943, after a younger brother was reported missing in action in the Battle of the Bismarck Sea, the 41-year-old Faurot joined the United States Navy where he was commissioned as a lieutenant. A total of four Faurot brothers served in the military during World War II. Chauncey Simpson, who had been the school's head track coach and a backfield coach for the football team, was appointed to serve as "acting football coach" during Faurot's military service.

Schedule

References

Missouri
Missouri Tigers football seasons
Big Eight Conference football champion seasons
Missouri Tigers football